The Cessna Model EC-1 was a 1930s American single-seat tourer built by the Cessna Aircraft Company

Design and development
Cessna Aircraft was suffering in the depression and downturn in the economy following the Wall Street crash. Eldon Cessna, the son of Clyde Cessna designed a low-cost cheap to operate aircraft to meet the new conditions. The Model EC-1 was powered by a 25 hp (19 kW) Cleone engine. It did not go into production. A two-seat version the Model EC-2 was also developed.

Surviving Aircraft
Only two examples of the EC-1 were built. The example stored at the Reynolds-Alberta Museum is thought to be the only survivor.

See also

References

EC-1
Single-engined tractor aircraft
High-wing aircraft
1930s United States civil utility aircraft